The Traveling Executioner is a 1970 American comedy-drama film directed by Jack Smight and starring Stacy Keach, Bud Cort, Stefan Gierasch and Marianna Hill.

The musical The Fields of Ambrosia is based on the film.

Plot
Jonas Candide, a former carnival showman, travels around the South in 1918 with his own portable electric chair, going from prison to prison with his young assistant, Jimmy, charging one hundred dollars per execution. Two of Jonas' potential victims are siblings Willy and Gundred Herzallerliebst. While Jonas successfully executes Willy, he falls for Gundred, hoping to fake her execution. He does, but then things turn dark for him.

Cast
 Stacy Keach as Jonas Candide
 Marianna Hill as Gundred Herzallerliebst
 Bud Cort as Jimmy
 Graham Jarvis as Doc Prittle
 James Sloyan as Piquant
 M. Emmet Walsh as Warden Brodski
 John Bottoms as Lawyer
 Ford Rainey as Stanley Mae
 James Greene as Gravey Combs
 Sam Reese as Priest
 Stefan Gierasch as Willy Herzallerliebst
 Logan Ramsey as La Follette
 Charles Tyner as Virgil
 William Mims as Lynn
 Val Avery as Jake
 Walt Barnes as Sheriff
 Charlie Briggs as Zak
 Paul Gauntt as Jeremy
 Claire Brennen as Woman Passerby (uncredited)
 Martine Fraser as 2nd Child (uncredited)
 Tony Fraser as 1st Child (uncredited)
 Katherine MacGregor as Alice Thorn (uncredited)
 Pat Patterson as Roscoe (uncredited)
 Lorna Thayer as Madam (uncredited)

Reception
Variety gave a positive review calling the film "a macabre, tastefully seamy comedy-drama about bayou prison life, circa 1918."

See also
 List of American films of 1970
 New Hollywood

References

External links 
 
 
 
 

1970 films
Films scored by Jerry Goldsmith
1970 comedy-drama films
American comedy-drama films
Metro-Goldwyn-Mayer films
Films directed by Jack Smight
1970 comedy films
1970 drama films
1970s English-language films
1970s American films
Films set in 1918
Films set in the 1910s